This is a list of people executed in the United States in 2017. A total of twenty-three people, all male, were executed in the United States in 2017, all by lethal injection. The state of Arkansas executed four people in April, ending a hiatus on executions in the state which had lasted for over 11 years.

List of people executed in the United States in 2017

Demographics

Executions in recent years

Double execution in Arkansas

On April 24, 2017, Arkansas carried out back-to-back executions. Convicted rapist and murderer Jack Harold Jones, age 52, was pronounced dead at 7:20 pm Monday. Approximately three hours later, convicted rapist and murderer Marcel Williams, age 46, was pronounced dead at 10:33 pm. Jones was sentenced to death for the 1995 rape and murder of Mary Phillips (August 18, 1959 – June 6, 1995) and the near-fatal assault of her then-10-year-old daughter, Lacy Phillips (born July 9, 1984), during a botched robbery in Bald Knob, Arkansas. Williams was sent to death row for the 1994 rape and murder of 22-year-old Stacy Errickson, whom he kidnapped from a gas station in central Arkansas.

The last double execution in Arkansas was on September 8, 1999. By conducting the double execution in 2017, Arkansas became the first U.S. state to put more than one inmate to death on the same day in 17 years. The last state to do so was Texas, which executed two murderers in August 2000. Oklahoma planned a double execution in 2014 but scrapped plans for the second one after the first (the execution of Clayton Lockett) went awry.

Arkansas executed four men in an eight-day period in 1960. The only quicker pace included quadruple executions in 1926 and 1930.

See also
 List of death row inmates in the United States
 List of juveniles executed in the United States since 1976
 List of most recent executions by jurisdiction
 List of people scheduled to be executed in the United States
 List of women executed in the United States since 1976

References

List of people executed in the United States
Executions
People executed in the United States
2017
Male murderers